Şenpazar District is a district of the Kastamonu Province of Turkey. Its seat is the town of Şenpazar. Its area is 252 km2, and its population is 4,304 (2021).

Composition
There is one municipality in Şenpazar District:
 Şenpazar

There are 23 villages in Şenpazar District:

 Alancık
 Aşıklı
 Aybasan
 Başçavuş
 Büyükmutlu
 Celalli
 Dağlı
 Demirkaya
 Dereköy
 Dördül
 Edeler
 Fırıncık
 Gürleyik
 Gürpelit
 Harmangeriş
 Himmetköy
 Kalaycı
 Küçükmutlu
 Salman
 Seferköy
 Tepecik
 Uzunyol
 Yarımca

References

Districts of Kastamonu Province